We Speak Music is the second album from Israeli psychedelic trance duo Ananda Shake, released on February 7, 2006.

Track listing
"Meshel 6 Days" – 7:29
"After Shock" – 8:17
"Street Fighters" – 7:43
"Pushing Me Out" – 7:38
"Digger" – 6:59
"Round Trip" – 7:30
"Ground Speed" – 6:56
"Shake Well Before Use" (album version) – 7:19
"Ornella Secrets" – 8:08
"We Speak Music" – 7:07

2006 albums
Ananda Shake albums